The term Serindia combines Seres (China) and India to refer to the part of Asia also known as Sinkiang, Chinese Turkestan or High Asia. See main entry under Xinjiang.

The art of this region is known as Serindian.

See also
Chindia

References
Hopkirk, Peter (1980). Foreign Devils on the Silk Road: The Search for the Lost Cities and Treasures of Chinese Central Asia. Amherst: The University of Massachusetts Press. .

Geography of Asia